Fachtna Murphy (born 26 June 1947) is a former Irish Garda who served as Garda Commissioner from 2007 to 2010.

Prior to his appointment he was the Deputy Commissioner with responsibility for operational policing strategies in the Garda Síochána. He grew up in Timoleague, County Cork. He joined the Garda Síochána in 1967 and holds a Bachelor of Arts (Hons) Degree in Police Management and a Diploma in Management and Industrial Relations, and has also studied policing methods overseas at both the FBI Academy, Quantico, Virginia, and at the Police College, Bramshill.

References 

Garda Commissioners
Living people
People from County Cork
1952 births